This is a list of golfers who have won three times in a Challenge Tour season since a policy was enacted to promote such players immediately to the European Tour.

*Includes earnings from one or more European Tour events played before promotion.

See also
List of golfers with most Challenge Tour wins

References

Challenge Tour
European Tour